HMS Duke of Edinburgh was the lead ship of the  armoured cruisers built for the Royal Navy in the early 1900s. She was stationed in the Mediterranean when the First World War began and participated in the pursuit of the German battlecruiser  and light cruiser . After the German ships reached Ottoman waters, the ship was sent to the Red Sea in mid-August to protect troop convoys arriving from India. Duke of Edinburgh was transferred to the Grand Fleet in December 1914 and participated in the Battle of Jutland in May 1916. She was not damaged during the battle and was the only ship of her squadron to survive. She was eventually transferred to the Atlantic Ocean in August 1917 for convoy escort duties.

The ship was sold for scrap in 1920.

Description

Duke of Edinburgh displaced  as built and  fully loaded. The engines were powered by 20 Babcock & Wilcox water-tube boilers and six cylindrical boilers. The ship's complement was 789 officers and ratings.

Armament
Her main armament consisted of six BL  Mark X guns in single turrets. The guns were distributed in two centerline turrets (one each fore and one aft) and four turrets disposed in the corners about the funnels. Her secondary armament of ten BL 6-inch Mk XI guns was arranged in single casemates. They were mounted amidships on the main deck and were only usable in calm weather. Twenty Vickers quick-firing (QF) three-pounders were fitted, six on turret roofs and fourteen in the superstructure. The ship also mounted three submerged  torpedo tubes.

Construction and career 
Duke of Edinburgh was ordered under the 1902/1903 naval construction programme as the lead ship of her class. She was laid down on 11 February 1903 at Pembroke Royal Dockyard in Wales. She was launched on 14 June 1904 and completed on 20 January 1906 at a cost of £1,193,414. Duke of Edinburgh was named after Alfred, Duke of Edinburgh, one of Queen Victoria's sons.

The ship was assigned to the 5th Cruiser Squadron from 1906 to 1908 and was then transferred to the 1st Cruiser Squadron of the Channel Fleet. When the Royal Navy's cruiser squadrons were reorganized in 1909, Duke of Edinburgh rejoined the 5th Cruiser Squadron of the Atlantic Fleet. On 13 August 1910 Duke of Edinburgh ran aground on Atherfield Ledge, Isle of Wight. She was successfully refloated, but in the resulting Court-martial to investigate the incident, the ship's Captain and Navigating Officer were severely reprimanded and the latter dismissed from the ship. She helped to rescue the survivors of the SS Delhi which ran aground off the coast of Morocco in December 1911. From 1913 to 1914 she served with the 1st Cruiser Squadron of the Mediterranean Fleet.

When the British began to prepare for war in July 1914, the ship was refitting at Malta. Her refit was cut short and she joined the rest of her squadron in the southern approaches to the Adriatic. She was involved in the pursuit of the German battlecruiser Goeben and light cruiser Breslau at the outbreak of World War I, but was ordered not to engage them. On 10 August Duke of Edinburgh and her sister ship  were ordered to the Red Sea to protect troop convoys arriving from India. While on that duty the ship captured the German merchantman Altair of 3,200 tons GRT on 15 August. While escorting a troop convoy from India to France in November 1914, Duke of Edinburgh provided cover to three battalions of infantry that seized the Turkish fort at Cheikh Saïd at the entrance to the Red Sea. The ship then landed a demolition party, which blew the fort up on 10 November; she then rejoined the convoy.

Duke of Edinburgh rejoined the 1st Cruiser Squadron, which had been transferred to the Grand Fleet in the meantime, in December 1914. In March 1916 the ship had her main deck 6-inch guns removed and the openings plated over. Six of the guns were remounted on the upper deck, three on each side, between the wing turrets, protected by gun shields. At the Battle of Jutland on 31 May 1916, the 1st Cruiser Squadron was in front of the Grand Fleet, on the right side. At 5:47 p.m. Their shells felt short and the two ships turned to port in pursuit, cutting in front of the battlecruiser , which was forced to turn away to avoid a collision. Duke of Edinburgh could not follow the first two ships and turned to port (northeast). The ship spotted the disabled German light cruiser  at 6:08 and fired twenty rounds at her. A torpedo attack by German destroyers on Admiral Beatty's battlecruisers, failed, but forced Duke of Edinburgh to evade one torpedo at 6:47. The ship reported a submarine sighting at 7:01, although no German submarines were operating in the area. She fired at another false submarine contact between 7:45 and 8:15.

After the battle, Duke of Edinburgh was attached to the 2nd Cruiser Squadron and remained at sea until 2 June, searching for disabled ships. She arrived in Scapa Flow on the afternoon of 3 June. On the evening of 18 August 1916, the Grand Fleet, including Duke of Edinburgh, put to sea in response to a deciphered message that the High Seas Fleet, minus the II Battle Squadron, would be leaving harbour that night. The Germans planned to bombard the port of Sunderland on 19 August, with extensive reconnaissance provided by airships and submarines. The Germans broke off their planned attack to pursue a lone British battle squadron reported by an airship, which was in fact the Harwich Force under Commodore Tyrwhitt. Realising their mistake, the Germans then set course for home. After Jutland the 2nd Cruiser Squadron, now including Duke of Edinburgh, was ordered to reinforce the patrols north of the Shetland Islands against German blockade runners and commerce raiders. The ship's foremast was converted to a tripod to support the weight of a fire-control director in May 1917, but when the director was actually fitted is not known. Two more 6-inch guns were added in embrasures on the forecastle deck during that same refit. She was transferred to the North America and West Indies Station in August 1917 for convoy escort duties, where she remained for the duration of the war. Upon her return, Duke of Edinburgh was stationed in the Humber, before she was sold for scrap on 12 April 1920 and broken up at Blyth in Northumberland.

Notes

Footnotes

References

External links

 Battle of Jutland Crew Lists Project - HMS Duke of Edinburgh Crew List

 

Duke of Edinburgh-class cruisers
Ships built in Pembroke Dock
World War I cruisers of the United Kingdom
1904 ships
Royal Navy ship names